Robert V. Royall (born 1934) was  a Republican businessman and banker and the United States Ambassador to Tanzania from 21 July 2001 to 3 November 2003.  Prior to this he had served as the South Carolina Secretary of Commerce from 13 January 1995 to 6 January 1999.

Royall has a bachelor's degree from the University of South Carolina.

Sources
listing of past ambassadors
bio of Royall
announcement of Royall's appointment as Ambassador

1934 births
University of South Carolina alumni
Living people
Ambassadors of the United States to Tanzania